April Lee Hernandez (born January 31, 1980) is an American film and television actress. She has also been credited as April L. Hernandez and April Hernandez-Castillo.

Personal life
Hernandez grew up  near the Grand Concourse in The Bronx. She is of Puerto Rican descent and has described herself as a "strong Latina."  Hernandez studied nutrition at Hunter College, but dropped out to pursue a comedy career after being inspired by John Leguizamo's off-Broadway production Mambo Mouth. Hernandez is married to Jose Castillo. The couple have a daughter named Summer Rose, who is best known for playing Alma Rivera from Alma's Way. Summer was born on September 30, 2012.

Acting career

Television
Aside from performing stand-up comedy, she has also appeared in several commercials, as well as on the television series ER, Law & Order, and 30 Rock. In June 2010 she was cast for the American cult series Dexter.
  She appeared in the television series Person of Interest episode "Legacy", which aired on January 18, 2012, in which she played an attorney who had turned her life around after a checkered childhood.

Movie
She is known for her role in the 2007 drama Freedom Writers, in which she played Eva, based on real-life high school student Maria Reyes. 
Hernandez has said that she was "determined" to be cast in Freedom Writers. She admires Jennifer Lopez, and has stated that Lopez "opened the door for me so that I don't have to take certain roles" as a Hispanic-American actress.

Filmography

Film

Television

References

External links

 DTM Magazine article

1980 births
Actresses from New York City
American film actresses
American actresses of Puerto Rican descent
American stand-up comedians
American television actresses
Hunter College alumni
Living people
People from the Bronx
American women comedians
Comedians from New York City
21st-century American comedians
21st-century American actresses
Converts to Protestantism from Roman Catholicism